Saint-Élix-Séglan is a small rural village and commune in the Haute-Garonne department in southwestern France. It is best known for the castle which dominates the village.

Geography
The commune is bordered by four other communes: Peyrouzet to the northwest, Aulon to the southwest, Cazeneuve-Montaut to the southeast, and finally by Aurignac to the northeast.

Population

Sights
The Château de Saint-Élix-Séglan is a 14th-17th century castle which is listed as a historic site by the French Ministry of Culture in 1991.

See also
 Communes of the Haute-Garonne department

References

Communes of Haute-Garonne